Besanko is a surname. Notable people with the surname include:

 Barry Besanko (born 1956), Australian rules footballer and sprinter
 Neil Besanko (born 1951), Australian rules footballer
 Peter Besanko (born 1955), Australian racing cyclist